Jimmie Harold Jones (born January 17, 1947) is a former American football defensive end in the National Football League for the New York Jets and the Washington Redskins.  He played college football at Wichita State University and was drafted in the sixth round of the 1969 NFL Draft.

A native of Englewood, New Jersey, Jones attended Dwight Morrow High School.

References

1947 births
Living people
Players of American football from Columbia, South Carolina
American football defensive ends
Wichita State Shockers football players
New York Jets players
Washington Redskins players
American Football League players
Dwight Morrow High School alumni
People from Englewood, New Jersey
Players of American football from New Jersey
Sportspeople from Bergen County, New Jersey